Patrick Nyarko (born January 15, 1986) is a Ghanaian former professional footballer.

Career

College
After coming to the United States in 2005, Nyarko was a star forward and three-time All-ACC selection for the Virginia Tech Hokies soccer team, which played in the 2007 Division I Men's College Cup, falling to Wake Forest in the National Semifinals.

Nyarko, who finished his Virginia Tech career with 31 goals, was called by coach Oliver Weiss, "the most incredible player I've ever coached" and he is considered to be the best soccer player in Virginia Tech history. Nyarko first met Weiss when the coach was on a recruiting trip to Ghana.

In Nyarko's freshman year, he scored the lone goal of his team's marquee win over then-#4 North Carolina. Tech rose as high as #10 in the polls and earned its second trip in school history to the NCAA tournament. Nyarko was named the Atlantic Coast Conference freshman of the year and was named to the all-ACC team.

Following the 2007 season, in which the Hokies finished #8 in the final AP poll and played in the National Semifinals of the 2007 Division I Men's College Cup, Nyarko was named as a finalist for the Hermann Trophy. His accomplishments for the Hokies led to his enshrinement into the Virginia Tech Sports Hall of Fame in 2018.

Professional
Nyarko decided to forgo his senior season and enter the 2008 MLS SuperDraft. Widely predicted to be the first pick in the draft, Nyarko was selected 7th overall by the Chicago Fire.

He made his MLS debut on June 15, 2008, against FC Dallas, and scored his first MLS goal on August 2, 2008, against Chivas USA.

After eight seasons with Chicago, Nyarko was traded to D.C. United on January 6, 2016, in exchange for a second round 2016 MLS SuperDraft pick. Nyarko scored his first goal for United on April 2, 2016, scoring against the San Jose Earthquakes. He missed the last 3 months of the season with concussion. He was out of contract with United following the 2017 season  and was considering retirement due to brain trauma due to 8 separate concussions he has suffered from.

International career
Nyarko was called up to the Ghana squad to face Chile. Nyarko made his Ghana debut against Chile on February 29, 2012, at the PPL Park in Chester, Pennsylvania.

Personal
Nyarko was granted a U.S. green card in 2011. This status qualifies him as a domestic player for MLS roster purposes.

References

External links

 

1986 births
Living people
Ghanaian footballers
Ghanaian expatriate footballers
Ghana international footballers
Virginia Tech Hokies men's soccer players
Chicago Fire FC players
D.C. United players
Major League Soccer players
Virginia Tech alumni
Expatriate soccer players in the United States
Chicago Fire FC draft picks
Footballers from Kumasi
All-American men's college soccer players
Association football wingers